Edwin Jones may refer to:

Edwin Arthur Jones (1853–1911), American composer
Edwin B. Jones (1917–1998), American business executive
Edwin J. Jones (1858-1930), American businessman and politician
Edwin Jones (footballer) (1891–1953), English footballer who played for Bristol City and Exeter City
Edwin Jones (department store), a store in Southampton, now part of the Debenhams group

See also
Edward Jones (disambiguation)

Jones, Edwin